As a subset of the Bratz line, in which all of the dolls are at infant age, it was titled under the brand name Bratz Babyz. The brand is split into two lines, the regular Bratz Babyz and the Bratz Big Babyz.

Bratz Babyz
In 2004, the first Bratz Babyz were made. The babyz were "Cloe", "Sasha", "Jade" and "Yasmin" (the first Bratz.) The dolls came with a changing bag, a nap blanket, bottle on a chain and a pet based on the girl's nickname (e.g. Sasha's nickname is Bunny Boo, so she has a bunny.) Later on, in 2005, "Meygan", "Fianna", "Cameron" and "Dana" joined the Bratz Babyz group.

Also, in 2005, they released the 'Hair Flair' collection. Instead of having plastic hair, the dolls had fiber hair like regular Bratz dolls.

Bratz Big Babyz

Soon after, they made Bratz Big Babyz; dolls approximately five times the size of regular Babyz dolls. In 2006, the Bratz Big Babyz Bubble Trouble Dolls appeared. These dolls laughed, burped, and blew bubbles when you fed them soda. Six months after the Bratz Babyz Hair Flair, the Big Babyz had their own realistic hair version released; the "Bratz Big Babyz Hair Flair".

Bratz Lil' Angelz

The Bratz Lil' Angelz are newborn babyz with different mouths then other bratz. They have a smile line and thin lips. They each come with newborn pets, and are numbered in a collection of dolls. They also came out at first with molded hair.

Secret Surprise dolls - Lil' Angelz came out with Secret Surprise dolls (dolls with hoodies). They could either be a boy or girl.

Heavenly Hair - Bratz Lil' Angelz came out with Heavenly Hair Dolls, which have the regular hair.

Tiny Tinklez - Bratz lil' angelz which urinate when given water. They come with two pets, which can also drink and urinate.

Alleged profanity

On Christmas Day 2006, Miami resident Kristina Acre received the Singing Jade doll as a gift. According to her father, Luis Acre, Kristina told him that the doll was saying "lots of bad words". According to Luis Acre these include "the f and b words". Later, MGA Entertainment responded on their website about the report. The lyrics—which do not contain profanity—are posted on the Bratz.com website in the Videos & Music section under Bratz Babyz The Movie - Music.

Bratz Babyz: The Movie (2006)
In September 2006, Bratz Babyz: The Movie was released on DVD by 20th Century Fox Home Entertainment, Deluxe Digital Studios, Sabella Dern Entertainment and MGA Entertainment. It was re-released by Lionsgate.

Plot 
Nita and Nora—who were Twiinz—get ready to join Cloe, Jade, Sasha and Yasmin at the daycare center—which was located at the mall. Snappy, Nita's puppy, jumps into Nora's bag when no one's looking, and Nora, hurrying to keep up with Nita, rushes out without knowing Snappy is in her bag. Once at the daycare center Snappy gets out and escapes into the mall. They also try to escape and find Snappy—being dog-napped by Duane, the bully at the mall. He demands $50 from the Bratz Babyz as a ransom for the dog. Having their ideas were different, and Jade, Cloe and Nora try to get Snappy back one way, while Sasha, Yasmin and Nita try to get her back another. When time starts to run out, they decide the only way to get $50 is for Nora to win it in the karaoke contest. They learn to team up and overcome the bully and get the puppy back.

Characters

 Cloe (Angel) - She has a pet winged piglet.
 Jade (Kool Kat) - She has a pet kitty.
 Yasmin (Pretty Princess) - She has a pet frog.
 Sasha (Bunny Boo) - She has a pet bunny.
 Nora (Kitten) - Nita's twin.
 Nita (Puppy) - Nora's twin.
 Cameron - The only one of the Baby Boyz line to appear in the film.
 Harvey - Cameron's best friend. 
 Ms. Calabash - Ms. Calabash is in charge of the Daycare.
 Duane - The main antagonist who steals Snappy and demands a $50 ransom payment from the Babyz.

Songs

 Theme from "Bratz Babyz"
 Catch Me If You Can
 We Can Do It
 Ready or Not
 All Together

Bratz: Super Babyz (2007) 

Bratz: Super Babyz is the second Bratz Babyz film released during the Autumn of 2007. The film was also released as the toy line, while video game adaptions are released for Nintendo DS and PC.

Plot 
The Babyz dream to be like their favorite superheroes. When the Babyz go to a super-hero theme park, their babysitter, Gran, buys them an alien matter exchanger, thinking it's a toy. With the help of the matter exchanger, the Babyz wake up with super powers—known for do good deeds by getting a cat down from a tree, saving two kids from a bully and preventing a bus from falling off a cliff. But the four aliens want their matter exchanger back, and kidnap Sasha. The Babyz save her, but they lose their powers and get locked in the aliens space ship, while the aliens change into human Babyz and take place. Sasha, Jade, Cloe and Yasmin must take on the aliens as regular Babyz.

Characters 
Cloe (Seireena), voiced by Britt McKillip
Jade (Glue Girl), voiced by Britt Irvin 
Sasha (Smartasha), voiced by Dorla Bell 
Yasmin (Speedy Princess), voiced by Maryke Hendrikse 
Gran, voiced by Betty Phillips 
Tuber, voiced by Jan Rabson 
Tater Tot, voiced by Sam Vincent 
Yam, voiced by Cathy Weseluck 
Spud, voiced by Jay Brazeau

Songs 

"Look At Us Now"
"Time To Take A Stand"
"It's Up To Me And You"
"Feel The Power"

Video Games 
 Bratz Babyz (PC/GBA)
 Bratz Super Babyz (DS/PC)

See also 
 List of Bratz characters

References

External links 
 Bratz.com: The official Bratz website.

Bratz
MGA Entertainment brands